Cholsey Abbey was an Anglo-Saxon nunnery in Cholsey in the English county of Berkshire (now Oxfordshire), which was founded in 986.

History
After King Edward the Martyr was murdered, his stepmother, Ælfthryth, was implicated in the crime.  Edward's death had allowed Ælfthryth's son, Æthelred the Unready, to become King of England. Both Ælfthryth and Æthelred were instrumental in establishing Cholsey Abbey: an act of expiation for Edward's death.

Following the Danish attack on Wallingford in 1006, it is thought that the invaders burnt the nunnery to the ground. However, some ruins may have survived to be rebuilt as St Mary's Church, Cholsey (the parish church), where Anglo-Saxon masonry survives in the tower.

Location
The site, nothing of which remains on the ground, lies immediately north-west of large village with its many amenities.

References
Royal Berkshire History: Cholsey
British History Online: Victoria County History of Berkshire: The Abbey of Reading (mentioning Cholsey Abbey)

986 establishments
Anglo-Saxon monastic houses
Christian monasteries established in the 10th century
1006 disestablishments in Europe
Monasteries in Berkshire
Monasteries in Oxfordshire
Church of England church buildings in Oxfordshire
10th-century establishments in England